Crystal Peak is a  mountain summit located within Olympic National Park in Jefferson County of Washington state. Crystal Peak is situated two miles north of Enchanted Valley, near the heads of Hayes River and Quinault River. Precipitation runoff from the mountain drains north to the Elwha River via Hayes River and Godkin Creek. Neighbors include line parent Chimney Peak,  to the south, and proximate parent West Peak,  to the east. The lower slopes of the mountain are surrounded by Western Red Cedar, Sitka Spruce, Western Hemlock, Alaskan Cedar, Mountain Hemlock, and Douglas-fir of the Quinault Rainforest.

History
This landform was originally named "Mount McCullough" in 1890 by the 1889-90 Seattle Press Expedition, for J. B. McCullough, the editor of the St. Louis Globe-Democrat. The mountain's present, official, descriptive name is attributable to quartz and silicates found in rocks on the peak's ridges. The first ascent of the summit was made in 1976 by George Bauer, Ron Brown, Bill Foster, Bill Larson, Mike Lonac, Sue Ritter, Roy Teague, and Jim White.

Climate

Based on the Köppen climate classification, Crystal Peak is located in the marine west coast climate zone of western North America. Most weather fronts originate in the Pacific Ocean, and travel east toward the Olympic Mountains. As fronts approach, they are forced upward by the peaks of the Olympic Range, causing them to drop their moisture in the form of rain or snowfall (Orographic lift). As a result, the Olympics experience high precipitation, especially during the winter months. During winter months, weather is usually cloudy, but due to high pressure systems over the Pacific Ocean that intensify during summer months, there is often little or no cloud cover during the summer. The months June through August offer the most favorable weather for viewing or climbing this peak.

Geology

The Olympic Mountains are composed of obducted clastic wedge material and oceanic crust, primarily Eocene sandstone, turbidite, and basaltic oceanic crust. The mountains were sculpted during the Pleistocene era by erosion and glaciers advancing and retreating multiple times.

See also

 Olympic Mountains
 Geology of the Pacific Northwest

References

External links

 
 Weather forecast: Crystal Peak

Olympic Mountains
Mountains of Washington (state)
Mountains of Jefferson County, Washington
Landforms of Olympic National Park
North American 2000 m summits